The 1992 San Marino Grand Prix (formally the XII Gran Premio Iceberg di San Marino) was a Formula One motor race held at Imola on 17 May 1992. It was the fifth race of the 1992 Formula One World Championship.

The 60-lap race was won from pole position by Nigel Mansell, driving a Williams-Renault. Mansell became the first driver to win the first five races of the season. Teammate Riccardo Patrese was second, with Ayrton Senna third in a McLaren-Honda.

Qualifying

Pre-qualifying report
In the Friday morning pre-qualifying session, Michele Alboreto was fastest for the first time this season in the Footwork. He was half a second faster than the Venturi Larrousse of Bertrand Gachot, who was himself a couple of tenths of a second faster than his team-mate Ukyo Katayama. The fourth pre-qualifier was again Andrea Chiesa, nearly a second behind in the Fondmetal.

As in Spain, the two cars failing to pre-qualify were the Andrea Modas of Roberto Moreno and Perry McCarthy. Moreno had tested with the team here at Imola, and improved the car prior to the Grand Prix weekend, and the result was that he was just 0.463 of a second behind Chiesa. McCarthy drove his first seven laps in the car, with no windscreen and an ill-fitting seat, and posted a time around 8.6 seconds slower than Moreno before stopping with a differential problem.

Pre-qualifying classification

Qualifying report
In the main qualifying session the Lotus of Mika Häkkinen, the Fondmetal of Andrea Chiesa, and the Brabhams of Damon Hill and Eric van de Poele were eliminated. This turned out to be the only race of 1992 in which Häkkinen failed to qualify.

Mansell took pole position by over a second from Williams team-mate Riccardo Patrese, who crashed at Tamburello corner two weeks before. The McLarens of Ayrton Senna and Gerhard Berger took up the second row, while the Benettons of Michael Schumacher and Martin Brundle filled the third row. The top ten was completed by the Ferraris of Jean Alesi and Ivan Capelli, the Footwork of Michele Alboreto, and the Ligier of Thierry Boutsen.

Mansell's pole position saw one of Formula One's hottest streaks come to an end, as Senna had taken pole in each of the previous seven races at Imola.

Qualifying classification

Race

Race report
The first start was aborted due to Karl Wendlinger's March stalling; he eventually started the race at the back of the grid. Stefano Modena started from the pit lane in his Jordan.

Mansell led every lap, finishing nearly ten seconds ahead of Patrese. Senna finished third, nearly forty seconds behind Patrese, but was unable to take his place on the podium due to discomfort he suffered all race, and was unable to get out of his car until long after the race ended; he had pulled off right after crossing the finish line, not even bothering to take a cool down lap. Ivan Capelli in the second Ferrari spun off into the gravel trap ending his race on lap 12. Michael Schumacher saw his first retirement of the season on lap 21 as he and teammate Brundle were pressuring Berger and spun out into the tyre wall on lap 21 with left suspension damage; despite fixing the problem on the front, the damage to the rear was too much and he retired in the pits only one lap later. On lap 40, Senna passed Jean Alesi going into the Villeneuve corner; Berger tried to do the same thing through Tosa, but Alesi closed the door and clipped Berger's car, lost control and clipped Berger's car again, damaging the McLaren's right rear suspension and destroying the Ferrari's front wing, forcing both drivers to retire; each side blamed the other for the accident. Mansell's win continued his perfect start to the 1992 season, with five wins from the opening five races; this broke the record of successive wins from the start of the season set by Senna the previous year.

Brundle finished fourth to pick up his first points of 1992. Alboreto finished fifth, and Pierluigi Martini finished sixth, scoring what would prove to be the Dallara team's last point in Formula One.

Race classification

Championship standings after the race

Drivers' Championship standings

Constructors' Championship standings

References

San Marino Grand Prix
San Marino Grand Prix
San Marino Grand Prix
Grand Prix
San Marino Grand Prix